Maj Helen Sorkmo (born 14 August 1969) is a Norwegian cross-country skier who competed from 1992 to 2003. She earned two World Cup victories, both in the 4 × 5 km relay in 2002.

Sorkmo also competed in two Winter Olympics, earning her best finish of sixth in the sprint event at Salt Lake City in 2002. Her best finish at the FIS Nordic World Ski Championships was 14th twice (sprint: 2003, 5 km: 1999).

Cross-country skiing results
All results are sourced from the International Ski Federation (FIS).

Olympic Games

World Championships

World Cup

Season standings

Individual podiums

4 podiums

Team podiums

 2 victories  
 9 podiums

References

External links

1969 births
Cross-country skiers at the 1998 Winter Olympics
Cross-country skiers at the 2002 Winter Olympics
Living people
Norwegian female cross-country skiers
Olympic cross-country skiers of Norway